The 2015–16 NEC women's basketball season began with practices in October 2015, followed by the start of the 2015–16 NCAA Division I women's basketball season in November. Conference play started in early January 2016 and concluded in March with the 2016 Northeast Conference women's basketball tournament.

Preseason

Rankings

() first place votes

All-NEC team

Head coaches

Note: Stats shown are before the beginning of the season. All numbers are from time at current school.

Postseason

NEC tournament

  March 6–13, 2016 Northeast Conference Basketball Tournament.

All games will be played at the venue of the higher seed

NCAA tournament

National Invitational tournament

Honors and awards

See also
2015–16 Northeast Conference men's basketball season

References

External links
NEC website